Zdeněk Kolář and Adam Pavlásek were the defending champions but chose not to defend their title.

Sander Arends and David Pel won the title after defeating Julian Lenz and Yannick Maden 7–6(7–4), 7–6(7–3) in the final.

Seeds

Draw

References

External links
 Main draw

Koblenz Open - Doubles
2020 Doubles